North Brother is a mountain located in Baxter State Park, Piscataquis County, Maine.  North Brother is flanked to the northeast by Fort Mountain, and to the southwest by South Brother; collectively the two are called "The Brothers."

The south and east sides of North Brother drains into a swampy area called "The Klondike", then into Wassataquoik Stream, the East Branch of the Penobscot River, and into Penobscot Bay.  The north and west sides of North Brother drain into Little Nesowadnehunk Stream, Nesowadnehunk Stream, and the West Branch of the Penobscot River.

The Appalachian Trail, a  National Scenic Trail from Georgia to Maine, reaches its northern terminus, on the summit of Mount Katahdin,  to the southeast of The Brothers.

See also 
 List of mountains in Maine

References

New England Four-thousand footers
Mountains of Piscataquis County, Maine
Mountains of Maine